Giovanni Cito (1633–1708) was a Roman Catholic prelate who served as Bishop of Lettere-Gragnano (1698–1708).

Biography
Giovanni Cito was born in Naples, Italy on 20 March 1633. He was ordained a deacon on 15 March 1671 and ordained a priest on 22 March 1671.
On 22 December 1698, he was appointed during the papacy of Pope Innocent XII as Bishop of Lettere-Gragnano.
On 28 December 1698, he was consecrated bishop by Pier Matteo Petrucci, Cardinal-Priest of San Marcello, with Tommaso Guzzoni, Bishop of Sora, and Domenico Belisario de Bellis, Bishop of Molfetta, serving as co-consecrators. 
He served as Bishop of Lettere-Gragnano until his death on 15 October 1708.

References

External links and additional sources
 (for Chronology of Bishops) 
 (for Chronology of Bishops)  

17th-century Italian Roman Catholic bishops
18th-century Italian Roman Catholic bishops
Bishops appointed by Pope Innocent XII
1633 births
1708 deaths